Cerithiopsis warmkae is a species of sea snail, a gastropod in the family Cerithiopsidae. It was described by Jong and Coomans, in 1988.

Description 
The maximum recorded shell length is 5 mm.

Habitat 
Minimum recorded depth is 58 m. Maximum recorded depth is 58 m.

References

warmkae
Gastropods described in 1988